The 2019 Nigerian Senate elections in Katsina State were held on February 23, 2019, to elect members of the Nigerian Senate to represent Katsina State. Kabir Abdullahi Barkiya representing Katsina Central, Mandiya Bello representing Katsina South, and Ahmad Babba Kaita representing Katsina North all won on the platform of All Progressives Congress.

Overview

Summary

Results

Katsina Central 
A total of 12 candidates registered with the Independent National Electoral Commission to contest in the election. APC candidate Kabir Barkiya won the election, defeating PDP candidate Hamisu Gambo and 10 other party candidates. Barkiya received 72.42% of the votes, while Gambo received 23.43%

Katsina South 
A total of 9 candidates registered with the Independent National Electoral Commission to contest in the election. APC candidate Bello Mandiya won the election, defeating PDP candidate Shehu Inuwa Imam and 7 other party candidates. Mandiya received 72.41% of the votes, while Imam received 26.43%

Katsina North 
A total of 12 candidates registered with the Independent National Electoral Commission to contest in the election. APC candidate Ahmad Babba Kaita won the election, defeating PDP candidate Usman Mani Nasarawa and 10 other party candidates. Ahmad Babba received 70.30% the votes, while Usman Mani received 26.41%

References 

Katsina State senatorial elections
Katsina State Senate elections